Jorge Yarur Banna (December 24, 1918 - October 17, 1991) was a Chilean banker. He served as the president of Banco de Crédito e Inversiones, a bank founded by his father, until 1991.

References

1918 births
1991 deaths
Chilean bankers
Jorge
Peruvian emigrants to Chile